 was a photographer of Tottori, Japan, who combined surrealist compositional elements with realistic depiction. Most of the work for which Ueda is widely known was photographed within a strip of about 350 km running from Igumi (on the border of Tottori and Hyōgo) to Hagi (Yamaguchi). 

The photographs Ueda takes are so unique. And in France, the birthplace of photography, his work style referred to as the Ueda-cho.
Ueda described himself as a mere amateur living in the countryside. Ueda did a lot of his work in his hometown of Tottori.

Ueda was born on 27 March 1913 in Sakai (now Sakaiminato), Tottori. His father was a manufacturer and seller of geta; Shōji was the only child who survived infancy. The boy received a camera from his father in 1930 and quickly became very involved in photography, submitting his photographs to magazines; his photograph Child on the Beach, Hama no kodomo) appeared in the December issue of Camera.

In 1930 Ueda formed the photographic group Chūgoku Shashinka Shūdan with Ryōsuke Ishizu, Kunio Masaoka, and Akira Nomura; from 1932 till 1937 the group exhibited its works four times at Konishiroku Hall (Konishiroku Hōru) in Nihonbashi, Tokyo. Ueda studied at the Oriental School of Photography in Tokyo in 1932 and returned to Sakai, opening a studio, Ueda Shashinjō, when only nineteen.

Ueda married in 1935, and his wife helped him to run his photographic studio. His marriage was a happy one; his wife and their three children are recurring models in his works. Ueda was active as an amateur as well as a professional photographer, participating in various groups.

In 1941 Ueda gave up photography, not wanting to become a military photographer. (Toward the end of the war, he was forced to photograph the result of a fire.) He resumed shortly after the war, and in 1947 he joined the Tokyo-based group Ginryūsha.

Ueda found the sand dunes of Tottori excellent backdrops for single and group portraits, typically in square format and until relatively late all in black and white. In 1949, inspired by Kineo Kuwabara, then the editor of Camera, Ueda photographed the dunes with Ken Domon and Yōichi Midorikawa. Some of these have Domon as a model, far from his gruff image. The photographs were first published in the September and October 1949 issues of Camera and have been frequently anthologized. Ueda started photographing nudes on the dunes in 1951, and from 1970 he used them as the backdrop for fashion photography.

The postwar concentration on realism led by Domon, followed by the rejection of realism led by Shōmei Tōmatsu, sidelined Ueda's cool vision. Ueda participated in "Japanese Photography" at the New York Museum of Modern Art in 1960 and had solo exhibitions in Japan, but had to wait till a 1974 retrospective held in the Nikon Salon in Tokyo and Osaka before his return to popularity. 

Ueda remained based in Tottori, opening a studio and camera shop in Yonago in 1965, and in 1972 moving to a new three-storey building in Yonago: Ueda Camera on the first floor, the Charanka coffee shop on the second, and Gallery U on the third. The building served as a base for local photographic life.

From 1975 until 1994, Ueda was a professor at Kyushu Sangyo University.

Critical and popular recognition came from the mid seventies. A succession of book-length collections of new and old appeared. Ueda weathered the death in 1983 of his wife, and continued working well into the 1990s. He died of a heart attack on 4 July 2000.

The Shoji Ueda Museum of Photography ( Ueda Shōji Shashin Bijutsukan), devoted to his works, opened in Kishimoto (now Hōki, near Yonago) Tottori Prefecture in 1995.

In 2015, a retrospective was published featuring previously unseen works. The publishers were given access to 5000 unpublished photos and includes a short story by [Toshiyuki Horie].

Books of Ueda's works

 Den'en no utsushikata. Ars Shashin Bunko 42. Tokyo: Ars, 1940. 
San'in no tabi. Text by Shimomura Norio. Gendai Kyōyō Bunko. Tokyo: Shakai Shisō Kenkyūkai Shuppanbu, 1962. 
Izumo no shinwa: Kamigami no furusato: Kamera no kikō. Text by Ueda Masaaki. Tokyo: Tankō Shinsha, 1965. 
Oki: Hito to rekishi. Text by Naramoto Tatsuya (奈良本辰也). Tankō Shinsha, 1967. 
Dōreki / Children the Year Around. Eizō no Gendai 3. Tokyo: Chūōkōronsha, 1971. Black and white photographs, many but not all of which show children, arranged by season. Texts in both Japanese and English.
Izumo jiryojō. Text by Ishizuka Takatoshi. Tokyo: Asahi Shinbunsha, 1971. 
Shinwa no tabi: Izumo, Hyūga no furusato. Text by Ueda Masaaki et al. Nihon no Furusato Shirīzu. Tokyo: Mainichi Shinbunsha, 1973. 
Izumo. Tokyo: Mainichi Shinbunsha, 1974. 
Ueda Shōji shōryokō shashinchō: Oto no nai kioku. Tokyo: Nippon Camera, 1974. 
Izumo Taisha (出雲大社). Text by Tōno Yoshiaki. Heibonsha Gyararī 24. Tokyo: Heibonsha, 1974. 
Sakyū / Kodomo no shiki / Sand Dunes / Seasons of the Children. Sonorama Shashin Sensho 11. Tokyo: Asahi Sonorama, 1978. With a summary in English in addition to the Japanese text.
Matsue: Sen kyūhyaku rokujū nen / Matsue. Yonago: San'in Hōsō, 1978. 
 Shin Izumo fudoki / A New Topography of Izumo. Nihon no Bi: Gendai Nihon Shashin Zenshū 5. Tokyo: Shūeisha, 1980. A large-format collection of color photographs of Izumo. Despite the additional English title (provided inconspicuously within the colophon), this book has no captions or text in English.
Ueda Shōji besutan shashinchō: Shiroi kaze / Brilliant Scenes. Tokyo: Nippon Camera, 1981. . 
 Ueda Shōji. Shōwa Shashin Zen-shigoto 10. Tokyo: Asahi Shinbunsha. 1983. 
Kidō kaiki / Shoji Ueda Polaroid 35m/m Photo Album. 3 vols. Self-published, 1986. 
Sakyū: Ueda Shōji shashinshū / Dunes. Tokyo: Parco, 1986. . 
Shoji Ueda: Fotografien 1930–1986. Bremen: Forum Böttcherstrasse Bremen, Museum für Fotografie und Zeitkunst Bremen, 1987. 
Umi kaze yama iro: Shashinshū / The view of Chugokuji. Tokyo: Gyōsei, 1990.
Fūdohen. . 
Shizenhen. . 
Ueda Shōji sakuhinten: Sakyū gekijo. JCII Photo Salon Library 15. Tokyo: JCII Photo Salon, 1992. Catalogue of an exhibition.  
 Ueda Shōji no shashin / Shoji Ueda. Tokyo: Tokyo Station Gallery, 1993. Catalogue of an exhibition held at the Tokyo Station Gallery in July–August 1993. With a very little text in English and French, but captions and much other material in Japanese only.
Ueda Shōji shashinshū / Shoji Ueda: Photographs. Tokyo: Takarajima-sha, 1995. . 
Shoji Ueda Photographs: 1930's–1990's.  Kishimoto, Tottori: Shoji Ueda Museum of Photography, 1995. 
Ueda Shōji sakuhinshū. Text by Ikezawa Natsuki (池沢夏樹). Tokyo: Parco, 1995. 
1. (Hito) tachi. . 
2. (Mono) tachi. . 
Stone Sculpture. Text by Nakaoka Shintarō. Tokyo BeeBooks, 1996. .
 "Oku no hosomichi" o yuku. Text by Kuroda Momoko. Shotor Library. Tokyo: Shōgakkan, 1997. . A lavishly illustrated retracing of the Oku no hosomichi of Matsuo Bashō.
 Ueda Shōji. Nihon no Shashinka 20. Tokyo: Iwanami Shoten, 1998. .
Ueda Shōji shashin no sakuhō: Amachua shokun!. Kyoto: Kōrinsha, 1999. . 
Shoji Ueda. Collection l'Oiseau rare. Trezelan: Filigranes, 2000. .
Ueda Shōji Watakushi no shashin sakuhō. Tokyo: TBS Britannica, 2000. . 
Manazashi no kioku: Dareka no kataware de. Text by Washida Kiyokazu. Tokyo: TBS Britannica, 2000. . 
Masaharu Fukuyama Portraits, Shoji Ueda Photographs. Kishimoto, Tottori: Shoji Ueda Museum of Photography, 2002. Catalogue of an exhibition held July–September 2002. Two volumes.
Une ligne subtile: Shoji Ueda, 1913–2000. Lausanne: Musée de l'Élysée; Paris: Maison européenne de la photographie, c2006. . 
Una Línia Subtil: Shoji Ueda 1913-2000. Barcelona: Fundació la Caixa, 2005. . In Catalan and English. 
Una Línea Sutil: Shoji Ueda 1913-2000. Barcelona: Fundació la Caixa, 2005. . In Spanish and English. 
 Ueda Shōji shashinshū: Fukinukeru kaze. Tokyo: Kyūryūdō, 2006. 
Ueda Shōji / Ueda Shoji. Hysteric 16. Tokyo: Hysteric Glamour, 2006.  (Inconspicuously, Ueda Shōji "chiisai denki" / Ueda Shoji, "Small Biography".) A collection of Ueda's series "Small Biography" (Chiisai denki), as it appeared in Camera Mainichi in the 1970s and 1980s.
 Boku no arubamu / An Album: The Everlasting Story. Tokyo: Kyūryūdō, 2007. . Despite the alternative title in English, all in Japanese. Photographs circa 1935–50, for the most part previously unpublished, and from prints newly made from Ueda's negatives. Many are of Ueda's wife.
Ueda Shōji no sekai. Corona Books 136. Tokyo: Heibonsha, 2007. .
 Ueda Shōji: Chiisai denki / Small Biography. Hankyū Komyunikēshonzu, 2007. . Only in Japanese, despite the alternative title.

Other books with works by Ueda

 Ueda Shōji to sono nakama-tachi: 1935–55 (Shōji Ueda and his friends, 1935–55). Yonago, Tottori: Yonago City Museum of Art, 1992. Catalogue of an exhibition held in February–March 1992 in Yonago City Museum of Art, with reproductions of many of Ueda's works.
Suihen no kioku: San'yō San'in no shashinka-tachi: Ueda Shōji, Hayashi Tadahiko, Midorikawa Yōichi, Matsumoto Norihiko ten. Onomichi, Hiroshima: Onomichi City Museum of Art, 1999. Catalogue of an exhibition of the works of Ueda, Tadahiko Hayashi, Yōichi Midorikawa and Norihiko Matsumoto. 
Midorikawa Yōichi to yukari no shashinka-tachi 1938–59. Okayama: Okayama Prefectural Museum of Art, 2005. 
Yamagishi, Shoji, ed. Japan, a Self-Portrait. New York: International Center of Photography, 1979.  (hard),  paper). Pages 105–110 are devoted to Ueda's work.
Self-Portrait. Hysteric 2. Tokyo: Hysteric Glamour, 1991.  
 Sengo shashin / Saisei to tenkai / Twelve Photographers in Japan, 1945–55. Yamaguchi: Yamaguchi Prefectural Museum of Art, 1990.  Catalogue of an exhibition held in Yamaguchi Prefectural Museum of Art. Despite the alternative title in English, almost exclusively in Japanese (although each of the twelve has a potted chronology in English). Twenty-one of Ueda's photographs of people on the Tottori dunes appear on pp. 104–114.
Tachihara Michizō. Ushinawareta yoru ni: Tachihara Michizō shishū. Tokyo: Sanrio, 1975. A poetry collection by Michizō Tachihara.

Notes

References
 Nihon no shashinka / Biographic Dictionary of Japanese Photography. Tokyo: Nichigai Associates, 2005. .  Despite its alternative English title, in Japanese only.
 Nihon shashinka jiten / 328 Outstanding Japanese Photographers. Kyoto: Tankōsha, 2000. . Despite its alternative English title, in Japanese only.
Tucker, Anne Wilkes, et al. The History of Japanese Photography. New Haven: Yale University Press, 2003. .
 Ueda Shōji. Nihon no Shashinka 20. Tokyo: Iwanami Shoten, 1998. . Particularly the chronology on pp. 68–9.
 Ueda Shoji chiisaidenki. Hankyu communications, 2008.
 Sanin nite Ueda Shoji no satsuei should ryokou. Shoji Ueda Museum of photography's brochure, 2018.
 Mittu no ki-wa-do de saguru Ueda Shoji no sekai. Shoji Ueda Museum of photography's brochure, 2022.

External links
Shoji Ueda Museum of Photography
Shoji Ueda Office
Ono, Philbert. " Ueda Shoji", Photoguide Japan.

Japanese photographers
Artists from Tottori Prefecture
Writers on photographic techniques
1913 births
2000 deaths